Judith R. Faulkner (born August 1943) is an American billionaire and the CEO and founder of Epic Systems, a healthcare software company located in Verona, Wisconsin. Faulkner founded Epic Systems in 1979, with the original name of Human Services Computing. In 2013, Forbes called her "the most powerful woman in healthcare", and on their 2020 list of the world's billionaires she was ranked 836th with a net worth of US$5.5 billion.

Early life and education 
Faulkner was born in August 1943 to Louis and Del Greenfield. Faulkner's parents inspired her early interest in healthcare; her father, Louis, was a pharmacist, and her mother, Del, was the director of Oregon Physicians for Social Responsibility. She was raised in the Erlton neighborhood of Cherry Hill, New Jersey, and graduated from Moorestown Friends School in 1961. She received a bachelor's degree in mathematics from Dickinson College and a master's degree in computer science from the University of Wisconsin–Madison.

Career 
In 1979, shortly after receiving her master's degree, Faulkner co-founded Human Services Computing, with Dr. John Greist.
Human Services Computing, which later became Epic Systems, began in a basement at 2020 University Avenue in Madison, Wisconsin. The company was started with a $70,000 investment from friends and family but has never taken investment from venture capital or private equity and remains a privately held company. In fact, Faulkner prides herself in the fact that Epic is homegrown; they have never acquired another company, and Faulkner has stated they will never go public. Epic Systems now holds the medical records of over 200 million people. Faulkner and her family currently own 43 percent of Epic Systems.

Awards and recognition 
 Forbes America's Top 50 Women In Tech 2018

Personal life 
Faulkner lives in Madison, Wisconsin. She is married to Dr. Gordon Faulkner, a pediatrician. They have three children.

In 2015, Faulkner signed The Giving Pledge, committing 99% of her assets to philanthropy.

References

1943 births
Businesspeople from Wisconsin
Dickinson College alumni
University of Wisconsin–Madison College of Letters and Science alumni
Living people
American women chief executives
American health care chief executives
American technology chief executives
Moorestown Friends School alumni
People from Cherry Hill, New Jersey
American billionaires
Female billionaires
Giving Pledgers
21st-century philanthropists
Wisconsin Democrats
21st-century American women